Fort Clonque is a 19th-century coastal fortress in Alderney, in the Bailiwick of Guernsey in the Channel Islands. It was constructed at a time when French naval power was becoming an increasing concern to the British. It is built on a rocky outcrop of land joined to the island by a causeway that can be submerged at high tide. It was manned by fifty men and fortified with up to ten guns, mostly 68-pounders; however, none was ever fired in anger.

Scenes from the film Seagulls Over Sorrento were shot at Fort Clonque in 1953.

The fort fell into disuse before being rescued by the Landmark Trust in 1966; it now provides comfortable self-catering accommodation for up to thirteen people.

References

External links

Landmark Trust Website

Landmark Trust
Buildings and structures in Alderney
Castles in the Channel Islands